"Dive! Dive! Dive!" is the third single from Bruce Dickinson's debut solo album, Tattooed Millionaire. It was released in August 1990.

Track listing
Dive! Dive! Dive! (Bruce Dickinson/Janick Gers) - 4:43
Riding With The Angels (Live) (Russ Ballard) - 4:21
Sin City (Live) (Angus Young/Bon Scott/George Young) - 4:50
Black Night (Live) (Ian Gillan/Ian Paice/Jon Lord/Ritchie Blackmore/Roger Glover) - 4:34

Personnel
Bruce Dickinson – vocals
Janick Gers – guitar
Andy Carr – bass
Dicki Fliszar – drums

Chart positions

References

1990 singles
Bruce Dickinson songs
Songs written by Bruce Dickinson
1990 songs
Sony Music singles